The Cooper T60 is a Formula One racing car from the Cooper Car Company, which was in use from 1962 to 1965. It won a single World Championship Grand Prix, the 1962 Monaco Grand Prix, driven by Bruce McLaren.

Development history
The Cooper T60 was the Cooper Car Company's entry for the 1962 Formula One season. It was the first Cooper designed specifically to use the Climax FWMV 1.5 litre V8. The chassis consisted of a steel tubular frame with aluminium bodywork. The front and rear suspension had double wishbones and coil springs. The engine was mated to Cooper's own 6-speed gearbox.

The first test drives were not very promising. In addition to constant problems with the response of the engine, there was gearbox damage. These technical defects were largely eliminated by the start of the season. In retrospect, the T60 is described in many publications, if not as a faulty design, then at least as a less-than-successful car. This assumption is not confirmed by the results of the 1962 works team, which won the Monaco Grand Prix and took third place in the constructors' championship.

Racing history

Cooper raced the T60 for the first time at the 1962 Dutch Grand Prix in Zandvoort, with Bruce McLaren at the wheel. In practice, the New Zealander qualified for fifth place on the grid and thus proved the competitiveness of the new design. In the race, McLaren drove the fifth lap with a time of 1:34.4 - corresponding to an average of  - which was the fastest lap of the race. Gearbox problems led to his retiral. At the Monaco Grand Prix, McLaren qualified third on the grid and led the field for six laps before being overtaken by the BRM of Graham Hill. However Hill's engine failed eight laps from the finish and McLaren took the win.

From the Belgian Grand Prix onwards, Cooper had a T60 available for both McLaren and Tony Maggs. After a double retirement in Belgium, Maggs drove his T60 to second place at the French Grand Prix while McLaren finished fourth.

More successful races and podium placements followed. McLaren finished third in the British Grand Prix, fifth in Germany, another two thirds in Italy and the United States, and finished the season with second place in South Africa. Maggs was less successful, his only points finishes were sixth in the British Grand Prix and third in South Africa. McLaren ended 1962 with third place in the drivers' championship and Cooper with third in the constructors' championship.

McLaren also won the non-championship 1962 Reims Grand Prix.

The South African Grand Prix was the last works outing of the T60, which was sold to private teams after the season ended, with Cooper introducing the T66 as its replacement.

In 1963, Jo Bonnier competed in the first four World Championship races with Rob Walker's T60. Bonnier's best finish was fifth in the Belgian Grand Prix. Scuderia Centro Sud entered their T60 for Mário de Araújo Cabral at the German Grand Prix where he retired with gearbox problems, and at the Italian Grand Prix where he failed to qualify.

The T60's last races were at the 1964 Italian Grand Prix and the 1965 British Grand Prix. In Monza in 1964 the Swiss Jean-Claude Rudaz was able to qualify a private T60 for the race; however, he was unable to participate after an engine failure on Sunday morning. In 1965, Bob Gerard Racing entered the car for John Rhodes; he retired with ignition failure on the 38th lap.

World Championship results
(key) (results in bold indicate pole position; results in italics indicate fastest lap)

1Includes two points scored by Cooper T552All but two points scored by other Cooper models

Non-Championship Results
(key)

References

Cooper Formula One cars
1960s cars
Cars of England
1962 Formula One season cars
1963 Formula One season cars
1964 Formula One season cars
1965 Formula One season cars